The WNWO Tower is a  high guy-wired aerial mast for the transmission of FM radio and TV programs in Oregon, Ohio, USA. The WNWO Tower was completed in 1966 and is property of Raycom Media, Inc. It is the tallest man-made structure in Ohio.

See also:  List of masts

External links

Buildings and structures in Lucas County, Ohio
Radio masts and towers in Ohio
1966 establishments in Ohio
Towers completed in 1966